"È", "è" is a letter.
The letter E with a grave accent.
In English, the letter è is sometimes used in the past tense or past participle forms of verbs in poetic texts to indicate that the final syllable should be pronounced separately. It also occurs in loanwords such as Italian caffè.
In Emilian, è is used to represent [ɛː], e.g. lèt [lɛːt] "bed". In Romagnol, it represents [ɛ], e.g. vècc [vɛtʃː] "old men".
 In French, it always represents a  sound of letter e when this is at the end of a syllable.
 È means "is" in modern Italian , e.g. il cane è piccolo meaning "the dog is small". It is derived from Latin ĕst and is accented to distinguish it from the conjunction e meaning "and". È is also used to mark a stressed  at the end of a word only, as in caffè.È (è) is used in Limburgish for the [ɛ] sound, like in the word 'Sjtèl'.È in Norwegian (both Bokmål and Nynorsk) is used in some words to denote a longer vowel such as in karrière (career).
The word 鄂, consisting only of this vowel, is an abbreviation for the Hubei province of the People's Republic of China.
 È (è) is also used in Macedonian Latin as an equivalent of the letter ye with grave (Ѐ, ѐ).
 È''' (è'') is used in Vietnamese to represent the letter "E" with the dấu huyền tone. It can also combine with "Ê" to form "Ề".

Key strokes 

See also
Ye with grave, a Cyrillic letter with a similar glyph.

Latin letters with diacritics
Polish letters with diacritics